William Holme was one of two Members of the Parliament of England for the constituency of York serving in five parliaments between 1547 and 1558.

Life and politics
William was born in 1501 to Reginald and Margery Holme in York. He married Margaret and they had six sons and seven daughters. William became a freeman of the city of York in 1521 by virtue of his father. He achieved the privilege in his own right through his career as a wax chandler in 1529. He was a master of the guild of St Christopher and St George in 1533. He also held several offices in the city, notably that of junior chamberlain (1529–30), alderman (1540), tax collector (1550) and Lord Mayor (1546–47).   

He became a notable citizen and gained the reputation of being a forcible negotiator on behalf of the city. During his time in Parliament he was very active. He secured and Act that allowed for the union of some parishes in the city reducing their number by a third. He also got the city's tax quota reduced in 1555.

He died on 8 September 1558 and was buried in St Denys's Church in York.

References

Members of the Parliament of England for constituencies in Yorkshire
English MPs 1547–1552

English MPs 1553 (Edward VI)

English MPs 1553 (Mary I)

English MPs 1554

English MPs 1554–1555
English MPs 1555

English MPs 1558

1501 births
1558 deaths